Olga Borisovna Barnet (3 September 1951 – 25 June 2021) was a Soviet and Russian actress who worked at the Moscow Art Theatre. The daughter of director Boris Barnet and actress Alla Kazanskaya, she made her film debut as Mother in Andrei Tarkovsky's Solaris (1972). She also appeared in the 1979 film Takeoff.

Filmography

References

External links

1951 births
2021 deaths
20th-century Russian actresses
21st-century Russian actresses
Honored Artists of the RSFSR
People's Artists of Russia
Russian people of English descent
Russian film actresses
Russian stage actresses
Burials at Novodevichy Cemetery

Soviet film actresses
Soviet stage actresses